Tiny Town & Railroad is a miniature village containing over 100 1/6 scale buildings and a  gauge miniature railway close to Morrison, Colorado.

History
George Turner, owner of Denver business Turner Moving & Storage and a friend of Buffalo Bill Cody, began building a miniature town for his daughter in 1915. Called Turnerville, he opened the site to the public in 1921.

Turnerville quickly became one of the state's most popular attractions, but it was plagued by damage from adjacent Turkey Creek flooding and a fire burned down the Indian pueblo in 1935. The train was added in 1939 and the name became Tiny Town.

An investigation determined the operator was not adequately trained in steam locomotive operation which resulted in confusion of the brake and throttle levers. The state fined Tiny Town $30,500 consisting of $1000 per incident the operator operated the train and $500 for not having documented training of emergency and safety procedures.

See also

Ridable miniature railway

References

Further reading

External links
Tiny Town & Railroad official site

Tourist attractions in Jefferson County, Colorado
Landmarks in Colorado
Miniature parks
15 in gauge railways in the United States
Buildings and structures in Jefferson County, Colorado